Proschismotherium is an extinct genus of ground sloth of the family Megalonychidae, endemic to Argentina during the Early Miocene. The type, and only, species, P. oppositum, was named in 1902 by Florentino Ameghino based on a single specimen found in the Santacrucian-aged Colpodon Beds of Argentina. Ameghino in 1902 placed Proschismotherium in the Megatheriidae, alongside Hapaloides, which was its sister taxon.

References 

Prehistoric sloths
Miocene mammals of South America
Fossil taxa described in 1902
Golfo San Jorge Basin
Sarmiento Formation
Neogene Argentina